Uniszki Zawadzkie  is a village in the administrative district of Gmina Wieczfnia Kościelna, within Mława County, Masovian Voivodeship, in east-central Poland.

The village has a population of 450.

References

Uniszki Zawadzkie